Juan Pablo Santiago Santiago (born 25 August 1980) is a Mexican retired footballer.

Career
Born in Zapotiltic, Santiago began playing football with the youth side of Atlas before making his senior debut in 1999. In a more than 10-year career, Santiago played for Atlas, Veracruz, Santos Laguna and Tijuana. The central defender won the Primera División with Santos in 2008.

On 9 March 2013, he announced his retirement from professional football.

Honors

Tijuana

Liga MX (1): Apertura 2012

References

External links

1980 births
Living people
Footballers from Jalisco
Atlas F.C. footballers
C.D. Veracruz footballers
Santos Laguna footballers
Club Tijuana footballers
Liga MX players
Mexican footballers
Association football defenders